Alessio Sakara (born September 2, 1981) is an Italian professional mixed martial artist, former professional boxer and Sanshou kickboxer, currently competing in the Light Heavyweight division. A professional competitor since 2002, Sakara has also formerly competed for the UFC, Bellator MMA, Jungle Fight, Cage Warriors, and M-1 Global.

Background
Born in Rome, Sakara began to compete in soccer at the age of five and was talented, playing the midfielder position. He began training in boxing at the age of 11. At the age of 18 Sakara began training with Roberto Almeida
in Brazilian jiu-jitsu, later earning a black belt under former UFC veteran Marcus "Conan" Silveira. Sakara turned to mixed martial arts after competing in amateur boxing matches because he did not think he would be able to support himself with the little money that boxers in Italy receive, and also did not prefer the tactical approach of the sport. Sakara was also attracted to the rising sport of mixed martial arts after his uncle showed him a VHS tape of UFC 5, which featured a bout between future UFC Hall of Famers Ken Shamrock and Royce Gracie, when Sakara was 19 years old. Shortly afterwards in 2000, Sakara relocated to Brazil in order to train with names like Ricardo De La Riva, Antônio Rodrigo Nogueira and Antônio Rogério Nogueira.

Mixed martial arts career

Early career
Sakara made his professional mixed martial arts debut in 2002, and compiled a record of 13–3 before being signed by the UFC.

Ultimate Fighting Championship
Sakara made his UFC debut at UFC 55, fighting against Ron Faircloth. The bout was ruled a no contest due to an inside leg kick to Sakara's groin.

Sakara next fought Elvis Sinosic at UFC 57 on February 4, 2006. He won the bout via a unanimous decision despite having a point deducted due to an illegal elbow.

Sakara was submitted in his next bout at UFC 60 by decorated grappling specialist and former King of the Cage Middleweight Champion Dean Lister.

Sakara was next expected to face Wilson Gouveia at UFC 65 on November 18, 2006. However, Gouveia withdrew  from the bout due to an injury and was replaced by Drew McFedries. Sakara lost the bout via first-round TKO.

Sakara rebounded from these losses when he fought Victor Valimaki at UFC 70 on April 21, 2007. He won via TKO at 1:44 of the first round.

At UFC 75 on September 8, 2007, Sakara lost for the third time in four fights, losing via first round TKO to Houston Alexander.

Sakara was part of UFC 80 on January 19, 2008, where he won via TKO in the first round against veteran James Lee.

Move down to middleweight
Following his victory over Lee, Sakara announced that he would be moving down to the Middleweight division. He made his middleweight debut against former WEC Middleweight Champion Chris Leben at UFC 82 on March 1, 2008. He lost the fight via first-round knockout.

At UFC Fight Night 15, Sakara defeated Joe Vedepo via KO in the first round with a head kick, which earned him Knockout of the Night honors.

Sakara was then expected to face Jake Rosholt at UFC Fight Night 17 on February 7, 2009, but the bout was cancelled when Sakara had to pull out due to a shoulder injury and was replaced by Dan Miller.

Sakara was then scheduled to face Rousimar Palhares at UFC 99 on June 13, 2009. However, for unknown reasons the bout was moved to take place at UFC 101 on August 8, 2009. Eventually, Palhares ended up withdrawing from the bout due to an injury and was replaced by former title challenger Thales Leites. Sakara won the bout via split decision.

The bout with Palhares was re-booked to take place on December 5, 2009, at The Ultimate Fighter 10 Finale, but Sakara had to withdraw after suffering an undisclosed injury while training. He was replaced by Lucio Linhares.

Sakara defeated James Irvin via first-round TKO on March 21, 2010, at UFC LIVE: Vera vs. Jones.

Sakara was forced to pull out of his fight with Nate Marquardt on July 3, 2010 at UFC 116 due to the death of his father.

Sakara was then scheduled to face Jorge Rivera on August 28, 2010 at UFC 118,  but Rivera pulled out of the bout with an injury and was replaced by Gerald Harris In turn, Sakara was forced off the card with an injury and replaced by Joe Vedepo.

His bout with Rivera was then rescheduled and was expected to take place on November 13, 2010, at UFC 122, but the fight was cancelled, Sakara intended on competing despite experiencing flu-like symptoms, but the bout was terminated due to Sakara vomiting backstage.

Sakara was expected to face Maiquel Falcão on March 3, 2011 at the UFC Live: Sanchez vs. Kampmann event. However, Falcão was injured while training and replaced by Rafael Natal.  Then in early February, Natal pulled out of the bout due to a knee injury, and was replaced by promotional newcomer Chris Weidman. Sakara lost a unanimous decision after getting repeatedly taken down and controlled by Weidman's wrestling.

The bout between Sakara and Rivera was rescheduled again for August 6, 2011 at UFC 133, but Sakara was forced out of the bout after tearing the ACL in his knee while training and was replaced by Costas Philippou.

Sakara faced Brian Stann on April 14, 2012, at UFC on Fuel TV: Gustafsson vs. Silva. He lost the fight via KO in the first round.

Sakara lost to Patrick Côté due to disqualification on November 17, 2012, at UFC 154 after rocking Côte with elbows, only to get caught up in the moment and land multiple blows to the back of Côté's head. Sakara's team immediately appealed the result, but the Quebec commission denied the appeal.

In late November 2012, Sakara signed a new four-fight contract with the UFC.

A rematch was briefly linked with Côté for March 16, 2013 at UFC 158. However, Sakara was forced out of the bout with a kidney illness.

Sakara was slated to face Tom Watson at UFC Fight Night 30. However, Watson was forced out of the bout with an injury and was replaced by Magnus Cedenblad. Subsequently in early October, Cedenblad was forced out of the Sakara bout with an injury and replaced by newcomer Nico Musoke. Sakara lost the fight by submission due to an armbar in the first round and was released from the promotion shortly after.

Final Fight Championship
After a nine-month delay, on July 24, 2014, Sakara signed a three-fight deal with the European promotion Final Fight Championship.

Sakara's Final Fight Championship debut took place on December 6, 2014 against Maciej Browarski. The fight was stopped in the first round when Sakara wasn't able to continue after getting injured from tearing his bicep. First Browarski was awarded the victory via TKO (injury), the result was later overturned to a No Contest by the Croatian MMA Federation.

In his next fight, Sakara faced off against Lebanon's Dib Akil. Following the opening seconds of the round, in which Akil threw wild hooks that unsuccessfully landed, Sakara took Akil to the ground and piled up punches until the TKO stoppage.

Bellator MMA
On November 27, 2015, it was announced that Sakara signed a three-fight contract with Bellator MMA.

Sakara made his promotional debut against Brian Rogers at Bellators first event in Sakara's native Italy on April 16, 2016 at Bellator 152. He won via knockout in the second round.

On September 21, 2016, it was announced that Sakara would be facing Joey Beltran in the co-main event of Bellator 168 on December 10, 2016. He won via knockout in the first round.

Bellator title shot
Sakara challenged Rafael Carvalho for the Bellator Middleweight Championship on December 9, 2017 at Bellator 190. He lost via knockout in the first round.

Post title shot reign
Sakara headlined Bellator 211 against Kent Kauppinen on December 1, 2018. He lost the fight via knockout in the first round.

Sakara faced Canaan Grigsby at Bellator Milan on October 12, 2019. He won the fight via TKO in the first round.

Sakara was scheduled to face Darwin Rodriguez at Bellator Milan 3 on October 3, 2020. However, Sakara ended up withdrawing from the bout due to an undisclosed injury.

On July 10, 2021, it was announced that he was no longer under contract with Bellator. However, in early 2023 news surfaced that Sakara was still under contract with Bellator.

Bare-knuckle boxing
In February 2023, it was announced that Sakara had signed a multi-fight contract with Bare Knuckle Fighting Championship.

Personal life
Sakara has two sons from a previous marriage. Recognizable for his many tattoos, Sakara has the words "Senatus Populusque Romanus" on his forearm, a common marking of soldiers of the Roman Empire, as well as several other tattoos that are a tribute to his ethnic background and love of Roman history. His surname comes from Saqqara, which was a Roman colony in Egypt.

Autobiography
In May 2020, a book in Italian about Sakara – Ogni giorno in battaglia. La mentalità del legionario – was published.

Championships and accomplishments
Ultimate Fighting Championship
Knockout of the Night (One time) 

 Italy Chinese Kung Fu Association
 Italian Heavyweight Pro Sanshou Champion

 World Chinese Kung Fu Association (World Pro Sanshou Championship)
 Silver Medal in Pro Sanshou: Heavyweight Class

Mixed martial arts record

|-
| Win
| align=center|21–13 (2)
| Canaan Grigsby
| TKO (punches)
| Bellator 230
| 
| align=center|1
| align=center|0:23
| Milan, Italy
| 
|-
| Loss
| align=center|20–13 (2)
| Kent Kauppinen
| KO (punch)
| Bellator 211
| 
| align=center|1
| align=center|1:10
| Genoa, Italy
| 
|-
| Win
| align=center|20–12 (2)
| Jamie Sloane
| TKO (punches)
| Bellator 203
| 
| align=center|1
| align=center|1:19
| Rome, Italy
| 
|-
| Loss
| align=center|19–12 (2)
| Rafael Carvalho
| KO (punches and elbow)
| Bellator 190
| 
| align=center|1
| align=center|0:45
| Florence, Italy
| 
|-
| Win
| align=center| 19–11 (2)
| Joey Beltran
| TKO (punches)
| Bellator 168
| 
| align=center|1 
| align=center|1:20
| Florence, Italy
| 
|-
| Win
| align=center| 18–11 (2)
| Brian Rogers
| KO (punches)
| Bellator 152
| 
| align=center| 2
| align=center| 2:29
| Torino, Italy
|
|-
| Win
| align=center| 17–11 (2)
| Dib Akil
| TKO (punches)
| Final Fight Championship 19
| 
| align=center| 1
| align=center| 1:32
| Linz, Austria
|
|-
|  NC
| align=center| 16–11 (2)
| Maciej Browarski
| NC (arm injury)
| Final Fight Championship 16 
| 
| align=center| 1
| align=center| 1:21
| Vienna, Austria
| 
|-
| Loss
| align=center| 16–11 (1)
| Nico Musoke
| Submission (armbar)
| UFC Fight Night: Machida vs. Munoz
| 
| align=center| 1
| align=center| 3:07
| Manchester, England, United Kingdom
| 
|-
| Loss
| align=center| 16–10 (1)
| Patrick Côté
| DQ (punches to back of head)
| UFC 154
| 
| align=center| 1
| align=center| 1:26
| Montreal, Quebec, Canada
|
|-
| Loss
| align=center| 16–9 (1)
| Brian Stann
| KO (punches)
| UFC on Fuel TV: Gustafsson vs. Silva
| 
| align=center| 1
| align=center| 2:26
| Stockholm, Sweden
| 
|-
| Loss
| align=center| 16–8 (1)
| Chris Weidman
| Decision (unanimous)
| UFC Live: Sanchez vs. Kampmann
| 
| align=center| 3
| align=center| 5:00
| Louisville, Kentucky, United States
| 
|-
| Win
| align=center| 16–7 (1)
| James Irvin
| TKO (punch)
| UFC Live: Vera vs. Jones
| 
| align=center| 1
| align=center| 3:01
| Broomfield, Colorado, United States
| 
|-
| Win
| align=center| 15–7 (1)
| Thales Leites
| Decision (split)
| UFC 101
| 
| align=center| 3
| align=center| 5:00
| Philadelphia, Pennsylvania, United States
| 
|-
| Win
| align=center| 14–7 (1)
| Joe Vedepo
| KO (head kick)
| UFC Fight Night: Diaz vs. Neer
| 
| align=center| 1
| align=center| 1:27
| Omaha, Nebraska, United States
| 
|-
| Loss
| align=center| 13–7 (1)
| Chris Leben
| KO (punches)
| UFC 82
| 
| align=center| 1
| align=center| 3:16
| Columbus, Ohio, United States
| 
|-
| Win
| align=center| 13–6 (1)
| James Lee
| TKO (punches)
| UFC 80
| 
| align=center| 1
| align=center| 1:30
| Newcastle, England, United Kingdom
| 
|-
| Loss
| align=center| 12–6 (1)
| Houston Alexander
| TKO (knee and punches)
| UFC 75
| 
| align=center| 1
| align=center| 1:01
| London, England, United Kingdom
| 
|-
| Win
| align=center| 12–5 (1)
| Victor Valimaki
| TKO (punches)
| UFC 70
| 
| align=center| 1
| align=center| 1:44
| Manchester, England, United Kingdom
| 
|-
| Loss
| align=center| 11–5 (1)
| Drew McFedries
| TKO (punches)
| UFC 65
| 
| align=center| 1
| align=center| 4:07
| Sacramento, California, United States
| 
|-
| Loss
| align=center| 11–4 (1)
| Dean Lister
| Submission (triangle choke)
| UFC 60
| 
| align=center| 1
| align=center| 1:20
| Los Angeles, California, United States
| 
|-
| Win
| align=center| 11–3 (1)
| Elvis Sinosic
| Decision (unanimous)
| UFC 57
| 
| align=center| 3
| align=center| 5:00
| Las Vegas, Nevada, United States
| 
|-
| NC
| align=center| 10–3 (1)
| Ron Faircloth
| NC (groin strike)
| UFC 55
| 
| align=center| 2
| align=center| 0:10
| Uncasville, Connecticut, United States
| 
|-
| Win
| align=center| 10–3
| Frank Amaugou
| Decision (unanimous)
| King of the Ring
| 
| align=center| 3
| align=center| N/A
| Milan, Italy
|
|-
| Win
| align=center| 9–3
| Tihamer Brunner
| TKO (punches)
| Ring Fight
| 
| align=center| N/A
| align=center| N/A
| Bergamo, Italy
| 
|-
| Loss
| align=center| 8–3
| Assuério Silva
| Decision (unanimous)
| Jungle Fight 3
| 
| align=center| 3
| align=center| 5:00
| Manaus, Brazil
| 
|-
| Win
| align=center| 8–2
| Eduardo Maiorino
| KO (punches)
| Real Fight 1
| 
| align=center| 1
| align=center| 0:30
| Rio de Janeiro, Brazil
|  
|-
| Win
| align=center| 7–2
| Yeon Jung
| KO (punches)
| WXF: X-Impact World Championships 2003
| 
| align=center| 1
| align=center| 2:02
| Seoul, South Korea
| 
|-
| Win
| align=center| 6–2
| Rafael Tatu
| TKO (doctor stoppage)
| Meca 9: Meca World Vale Tudo 9
| 
| align=center| 2
| align=center| 4:18
| Rio de Janeiro, Brazil
|
|-
| Win
| align=center| 5–2
| Damien Riccio
| Decision (unanimous)
| Martial Arts Day
| 
| align=center| 2
| align=center| 6:00
| Rome, Italy
| 
|-
| Win
| align=center| 4–2
| David Mortelette
| TKO (punches)
| Resa Dei Conti 6
| 
| align=center| 1
| align=center| 1:12
| Livorno, Italy
| 
|-
| Loss
| align=center| 3–2
| Roman Zentsov
| Decision (unanimous)
| M-1 MFC: Russia vs. the World 4
| 
| align=center| 2
| align=center| 5:00
| St. Petersburg, Russia
| 
|-
| Loss
| align=center| 3–1
| Simon Holmes
| Submission (rear-naked choke)
| CWFC 1: Armageddon
| 
| align=center| 1
| align=center| 4:50
| London, England
| 
|-
| Win
| align=center| 3–0
| Adam Woolmer
| Submission (kimura)
| CWFC 1: Armageddon
| 
| align=center| 1
| align=center| 0:21
| London, England
| 
|-
| Win
| align=center| 2–0
| Mastioli Mastioli
| Submission (armbar)
| Fight Night
| 
| align=center| 1
| align=center| 0:20
| Pomezia, Italy
| 
|-
| Win
| align=center| 1–0
| Paolo Di Clementi
| KO (punches)
| Fight Night
| 
| align=center| 1
| align=center| 0:13
| Pomezia, Italy
|

Professional boxing record

See also
 List of male boxers

References

External links

Official UFC Profile

Official website
American Top Team
facts for Sakara relation to egyptian Sakari

1981 births
Italian male mixed martial artists
Cruiserweight boxers
Middleweight mixed martial artists
Light heavyweight mixed martial artists
Italian practitioners of Brazilian jiu-jitsu
Sportspeople from Rome
Living people
Italian male boxers
Italian sanshou practitioners
People awarded a black belt in Brazilian jiu-jitsu
Ultimate Fighting Championship male fighters
Mixed martial artists utilizing sanshou
Mixed martial artists utilizing boxing
Mixed martial artists utilizing Brazilian jiu-jitsu